Carbia calescens is a moth in the  family Geometridae. It is found on Borneo and Sumatra. The habitat consists of lowland areas.

Adults have grey forewings with a dark brown lunule distal to the central part of the postmedial 'M'-shape on the forewing. The hindwings are pale orange.

References

Moths described in 1866
Eupitheciini
Moths of Indonesia